William Ware (August 3, 1797 – February 19, 1852) was an American writer and minister.

Biography
Ware was born in Hingham, Massachusetts on August 3, 1797. He graduated from Harvard University in 1816, studied for the Unitarian ministry, and preached mainly in New York, and later in Massachusetts.

He achieved literary recognition chiefly from his authorship of two historical romances, Zenobia, or the Fall of Palmyra (first published as Letters from Palmyra, 1836 and 1837) and Aurelian (first published as Probus, 1838).

He contributed the Life of Nathaniel Bacon to Jared Sparks's The Library of American Biography. His Lectures on the works and genius of Washington Allston appeared in print in 1852. His Writings were published in 1904.

He died in Cambridge, Massachusetts on February 19, 1852.

References

External links
 
 
 The papers of William Ware are in the Andover-Harvard Theological Library at Harvard Divinity School in Cambridge, Massachusetts.

1797 births
1852 deaths
19th-century American novelists
American male novelists
Harvard University alumni
American historical novelists
19th-century American male writers